Stefan Bukorac (born 15 February 1991) is a Serbian professional footballer who plays as a midfielder for Shakhter Karagandy.

Club career
He played for Graničar from Grabovci, Srem, Partizan from Vitojevci and Jedinstvo Platičevo, before he joined Donji Srem. He was nominated for the best footballer of Srem in 2013.

References

External links
 
 Stefan Bukorac Stats at utakmica.rs
 FC Dinamo Tbilisi official Profile

1991 births
Living people
Sportspeople from Sremska Mitrovica
Serbian footballers
Association football midfielders
Serbian SuperLiga players
Serbian expatriate footballers
Serbian expatriate sportspeople in Georgia (country)
Expatriate footballers in Georgia (country)
Expatriate footballers in Cyprus
Expatriate footballers in Montenegro
Expatriate footballers in Belarus
Expatriate footballers in Kazakhstan
FK Donji Srem players
FC Dinamo Tbilisi players
FK Metalac Gornji Milanovac players
Enosis Neon Paralimni FC players
OFK Titograd players
FK Proleter Novi Sad players
FC Torpedo-BelAZ Zhodino players
FC Caspiy players
FC Shakhter Karagandy players